"Sunnyroad" is the second single for the Fisherman's Woman record, released by Emiliana Torrini in 2005. It reached number 82 on the UK Singles Chart.

Track listing
 "Sunnyroad" (album version)
 "Sunnyroad" (radio version)
 "Sunnyroad" (Manasseh mix)
 "Sunnyroad" (Atom TM's Future Folk mix)
 "Sunnyroad" (music video)

Charts

References

Emilíana Torrini songs
2005 singles
Songs written by Emilíana Torrini
2005 songs
Songs written by Dan Carey (record producer)
Pop-folk songs